The Casa Mata Plan Revolution was a contextualized armed conflict between the struggles between the republican and pro-imperialist factions during the first half of the 19th century in the First Mexican Empire.

Background 
The last Spanish stronghold in Mexico, was Fort of San Juan de Ullua on a small island off the coast of Veracruz. There had been a change in command at the fort during this time, and general Santa Anna, stationed in Veracruz planned a scheme of taking possession of it
by feigning the surrender of Veracruz to its new commander. When Echevarri, the captain-general of the local provinces, arrived in Veracruz, he approved of the plan, and agreed to join in on it, positioning his troops in Veracruz
to ambush the landing Spaniards, having been promised support by Santa Anna. On October 26, 1822, as the Spaniards landed however, Santa Anna's troops failed to arrive, and Echevarri barely defeated the landing party, and the Spanish ultimately kept
control of the fort. Echevarri expressed his suspicion to Iturbide that it had all been a scheme by Santa Anna to get Echeverri killed as revenge for Santa Anna not having been appointed Captain-General himself. Iturbide himself went to Veracruz to dismiss Santa Anna from his command, not overtly however but rather
under the pretext of simply moving him to a different post in Mexico City. However, Santa Anna suspecting his ruin, instead took command of his troops and in December, 1822 started a rebellion in favor of a republican form of government.

Santa Anna Uprising 
When Iturbide learned of the rebellion, Santa Anna was declared a traitor, deprived of his rank, and pardon was offered to any of his followers who would return their allegiance to the Empire, within an allotted time. Troops were advanced against the insurgents. 
Santa Anna meanwhile published a manifesto, and was joined by hero of the independence wars, Guadalupe Victoria. The insurgents began calling themselves the Liberating Army, and were spreading in popularity. Santa Anna was defeated on December 21 when he attacked Jalapa, and even considered flight to the United States, but Victoria assured him, urging him to garrison Veracruz, and telling Santa Anna "you can set sail when they show you my head"

Resistance of Santa Anna and Battle of Almolonga 

Vicente Guerrero and Nicolas Bravo, defected from the ranks of the imperialists, and proceeded to Chilapa on January 5, 1823, to join the revolution, but experienced a disastrous defeat at Almolonga. 
The insurrection was mostly being suppressed at this time, Victoria being held in check at Puente del Rey, and Santa Anna still confined at Veracruz. 

At this point however, opposition to the government began to negotiate with the military. Echevarri was sent to take care of the rebellion in Veracruz, but ended up defecting. 
On February 1, 1823, a junta of military chiefs met to proclaim the Plan of Casa Mata. The army pledged itself to restore
Congress while disavowing any intention of harming the person of the Emperor, or of overthrowing the Mexican monarchy. On February 14, Puebla proclaimed for the plan, followed by San Luis Potosí, and Guadalajara. 
By March, most of Mexico had proclaimed in favor of the plan.

Comanche Alliance 
The next day, the 4th Cavalry Regiment, and in the immediate night the rest of the grenadiers on horseback that formed the Emperor's guard joined the rebels, keeping Iturbide with the forces that accompanied him in Ixtapaluca, where he was to cut the communications of the rebels of Puebla and prevent further defections. Iturbide then contacted the Comanche Guonique captain who had traveled to Mexico City to celebrate peace treaties with the government. The Comanche captain offered to raise 20,000 men to defeat the insurgents. However, by then the government had made such concessions to those pronounced that even with all that help it would be difficult to overcome.

Restitution of Congress and talks with the insurgents 
Iturbide was then forced to restore the Congress, who in a speech ordered to provide resources to the pronounced, pointing out the points they should occupy, and then carry out an amnesty and thus forget the grievances of the past. Then he believed that that would be enough for the country to return to its tranquility, he left Ixtapaluca and went with his forces to his residence in Tacubaya. Before the demonstrations that made it impossible for the emperor to leave his room and wanted the occupation of the forces of the Liberating Army, the Revolutionary Board of Puebla decided not to recognize the Congress until it moved to a place far from the jurisdiction of the emperor.

Fall of the Empire 
It is then that Iturbide abdicates, before the advance of the insurgents on the capital. But by not reaching an agreement on how it would be, the Liberating Army was about to collide with the imperial troops. Iturbide, wanting to avoid the conflict, sent the military commander of the capital, Brigadier Manuel Gómez Pedraza to Santa Marta, where General and Marquis Antonio de Vivanco had located his headquarters, to enter into an agreement with the pronounced.

In a war meeting in which Vivanco, Bravo, Echávarri, Miguel Barragán and others were, a 3-article agreement was signed on March 26, recognizing the character that Congress would grant to Iturbide; that he was free and that he leave Tulancingo with his family escorted by General Bravo on the third day, as Iturbide had requested; and finally, that the troops that had been faithful to him until the end were considered belonging to the liberating army. Thus Iturbide withdrew with his family while the rebels entered the capital.

Further reading
RIVA PALACIO, Vicente (1940). Mexico through the centuries : general and complete history of the social, political, religious, military, artistic, scientific and literary development of Mexico from ancient times to the present time; work, unique in its kind. (GS López edition). Mexico.

References 

Wars involving Mexico
Conflicts in 1822
Conflicts in 1823
1822 in Mexico
1823 in Mexico
Civil wars involving the states and peoples of North America